1980 Emmy Awards may refer to:

 32nd Primetime Emmy Awards, the 1980 Emmy Awards ceremony that honored primetime programming during June 1979 – May 1980
 7th Daytime Emmy Awards, the 1980 Emmy Awards ceremony honoring daytime programming during 1979
 8th International Emmy Awards, the 1980 Emmy Awards ceremony honoring international programming

Emmy Award ceremonies by year